Durmitor (Montenegrin: Дурмитор,  or ) is a massif located in northwestern Montenegro. It is part of the Dinaric Alps.

The massif is limited by the Tara River Canyon on the north, the Piva River Canyon on the west, and by the Komarnica River Canyon on the south. The Sinjavina mountain is located to the east of the Jezerska površ plateau. The Durmitor is for the most part located in the Žabljak municipality.

The massif gives its name to the national park that comprises it. Durmitor National Park was founded in 1952, and designated as a World Heritage Site in 1980.

Peaks

The massif has 48 peaks above . Highest peaks are:

 Bobotov kuk 
 Bezimeni vrh (Nameless Peak) 
 Šljeme 
 Istočni vrh Šljemena (East Peak of Sljeme) 
 Soa / Đevojka 
 Milošev tok 
 Bandijerna 
 Rbatina 
 Lučin vrh 
 Prutaš 
 Minin bogaz 
 Planinica 
 Kobilja glava 
 Savin Kuk 
 Šupljika

Lakes
Durmitor features 18 glacial lakes, scattered over mountain massif and Jezerska Površ plateau. The lakes add significantly to the beauty of the mountain, and have been nicknamed Gorske Oči, or "mountain eyes".

 Black Lake
 Veliko Škrčko Lake
 Malo Škrčko Lake
 Zeleni Vir
 Jablan Lake
 Valovito Lake

 Vir u Lokvicama
 Srablje Lake
 Modro Lake
 Suva Lokva
 Zminje Lake
 Barno Lake

 Pošćensko Lake
 Zabojsko Lake
 Vražje Lake
 Riblje Lake
 Zminčko Lake
 Sušičko Lake

Name
One theory of the name Durmitor is that it is derived from Balkan Romance-Vlach, meaning 'sleeping place' (cognate with English dormitory). There are similarly named mountains, such as Visitor (cf. visător 'dreamer') and Cipitor (cf. aţipitor 'sleeper') across the former Yugoslavia.

Another, more likely theory is that the name was given by the Celts, and the meaning would be anything from 'water from the mountain' to 'ridged mountain'. Considering the duration of time that the ancient Celts spent around these part and the Tara River (Tara is a Celtic goddess, as well), its name being of Celtic origin, it is very possible that Durmitor is a name of similar origin. Zeta river also has a Celtic origin name ("Loved one").

National park

It is the largest protected area in Montenegro, and it was inscribed on the list of UNESCO World Heritage Sites in 1980. 

Tourism

Durmitor mountain is the centre of Montenegrin mountain tourism. The tourist facilities are concentrated around the town of Žabljak. In winter, the main activities on Durmitor are skiing and snowboarding. In summer, the activities shift to hiking, mountaineering and recreational tourism. Water sports are also practiced in the area. One of the most prominent attractions of Durmitor mountain are 18 glacial lakes, the best known of which is the Black Lake.

Gallery

References

External links

 Official National Park Site
 UNESCO World Heritage Site profile
 UNEP-WCMC World Heritage Site datasheet 
 SummitPost: Useful information (Camping, routes, weather etc.)
 Photogallery Durmitor and Bjelasica

Dinaric Mountains mixed forests
Mountains of Montenegro
National parks of Montenegro
Protected areas established in 1952
Two-thousanders of Montenegro
World Heritage Sites in Montenegro